Yesan FC (Hanja: 禮山FC) is a South Korean soccer club based in Yesan county.

Yesan FC played in the Korea National League. The team was founded as Seosan Citizen in Seosan in 2002, and competed as Seosan Omega in the 2007 league season prior to the relocation to Yesan ahead of the 2008 season.

In 2011, the team decided to withdraw from the league due to the budgetary problems.

Name history
2002 : Founded as Seosan Citizen
2007 : Renamed Seosan Omega
2008 : Renamed Yesan FC

Statistics

References

N
Sport in South Chungcheong Province
Yesan County
Association football clubs established in 2002
2002 establishments in South Korea
2011 disestablishments in South Korea
Association football clubs disestablished in 2011